Familia Zaragoza (English: Zaragoza Family) is a Philippine reality drama television series that aired on ABS-CBN from July 2, 1995 to September 29, 1996.

Plot
The story of Familia Zaragoza, an intricate web of lies and deception surrounding the Zaragoza family is engineered by a woman who is insanely driven with ambition that she would resort to manipulation, treachery, and even murder to achieve her goals. With the death of Don Luis, the patriarch of the wealthy Zaragoza clan, the dark veil of secrecy is slowly lifted as the drama begins.

The widowed Doña Amparo Zaragoza does not waste time to know how much she and her children, Divina and Alfredo, have inherited. To her surprise, most of Don Luis Zaragoza's estate is awarded to a certain Benita who is believed to be the legal wife of the deceased. Doña Amparo insists that she is the only spouse the society and the entire Zaragoza clan has known and being confined in a mental institution for so long, Benita has never been a wife to the late Don. Even though the situation does not turn out the way she has expected, Doña Amparo is confident that she will win her case believing that someone who is mentally ill could not possibly mind about her inheritance. What she does not know is that Beatrice, Don Luis and Benita's daughter and only legitimate heir who was believed to be dead, is alive and well. Deprived of her father's love and support since birth, she will try to pursue the full inheritance of her father's wealth and leave his mistress and illegitimate children with nothing.

Divina and her mother share the same fate in a way that they both have fallen deeply in love with another woman's husband. When she met Lorenzo, she knew very well that he has a wife, Ester, and has three children with her. They live in a shanty not very far away from the Zaragoza mansion. Divina had convinced Lorenzo to leave the country with her and start a new life in the United States. Lorenzo agreed, if only for the sake of his ailing wife and the future of his three children. Lorenzo worked hard to support his two families with his business in the States. But with Lorenzo's absence, Ester's children have learned to believe that their father abandoned them for a more comfortable life.

Unknown to both, the wealthy Divina and the lowly Ester share more than the love for the same man. Not far ahead looms a chartered fate that will boggle even one's wildest imagination.

Cast and characters

Main cast
 Janice de Belen as Lupe Lagrimas
 Jaclyn Jose as Ester Lagrimas
 Gloria Romero as Doña Amparo Zaragoza

Supporting cast
 Tommy Abuel as Atty. Nicolas Fuentabella
 Marvin Agustin as Danilo
 Rita Avila as Vivian Zaragoza
 Carlo Aquino as Miguel Lagrimas
 Anton Bernardo as David
 Robin Da Roza as Ramon
 Ricky Davao as Alfredo Zaragoza
 Julio Diaz as Lorenzo Lagrimas
 John Estrada as Sgt. Charlie Rodriguez
 Luz Fernandez as Ensang
 Farah Florer as Marinella
 Emilio Garcia as Greg
 Jean Garcia as Beatrice Fuentebella 
 Jason Javellona as Nico Fuentebella
 Teresa Loyzaga as Atty. Katrina Dela Costa
 Matthew Mendoza as Gabby
 Stefano Mori as Danilo Lagrimas
 Elizabeth Oropesa as Dra. Bienvenida Perea Fuentebella
 Zsa Zsa Padilla as Divina Zaragoza-Lagrimas
 Angelica Panganiban as Angelica Lagrimas
 Gina Pareño as Doña Benita Zaragoza
 Paula Peralejo as Samantha Lagrimas
 Lito Pimentel as Raul
 John Prats as Luigi Lagrimas
 Cherry Pie Picache as Elena
 Celia Rodriguez as Doña Elvira
 Princess "Empress" Schuck as Lorena Lagrimas
 Glaiza Serrano as Olga Zaragoza
Joshua Spafford as Atty. Andy Concepcion
 Lucita Soriano as Trining Toledo
 Eula Valdez as Nimfa
 Joy Viado as Mitchie

Guest cast
 Eddie Rodriguez as Don Luis Zaragoza

References

External links
 

ABS-CBN drama series
1995 Philippine television series debuts
1996 Philippine television series endings
Filipino-language television shows
Television shows set in the Philippines